Haliclona crowtheri is a species of demosponge first found on the coast of South Georgia Island, in the south west Southern Ocean.

References

External links
WORMS

Animals described in 2012
crowtheri